Tottenham Wood was part of the Great Forest of Middlesex. It no longer survives, except for a small fragment in the form of Bluebell Wood.

References 

Ancient woods of London